In enzymology, an enterobactin synthase (2,3-dihydroxybenzoate—serine ligase) is an enzyme that catalyzes the chemical reaction

ATP + 2,3-dihydroxybenzoate + L-serine  products of ATP breakdown + N-(2,3-dihydroxybenzoyl)-L-serine

The 3 substrates of this enzyme are ATP, 2,3-dihydroxybenzoate, and L-serine, whereas its two products are products of ATP breakdown and N-(2,3-dihydroxybenzoyl)-L-serine.

This enzyme belongs to the family of ligases, specifically those forming carbon-nitrogen bonds as acid-D-amino-acid ligases (peptide synthases).  The systematic name of this enzyme class is 2,3-dihydroxybenzoate:L-serine ligase. Other names in common use include N-(2,3-dihydroxybenzoyl)-serine synthetase, and 2,3-dihydroxybenzoylserine synthetase.

References

 

EC 6.3.2
Enzymes of unknown structure